Ralph Ernest Miller (22 June 1941 – September 2014) was an English professional footballer. His clubs included Charlton Athletic, Bournemouth & Boscombe Athletic and Gillingham, where he made over 100 Football League appearances.

References

1941 births
2014 deaths
Sportspeople from Slough
English footballers
Association football defenders
Slough Town F.C. players
Charlton Athletic F.C. players
Gillingham F.C. players
AFC Bournemouth players
Weymouth F.C. players
Poole Town F.C. players
Ringwood Town F.C. players
English Football League players
Footballers from Berkshire